Voëlvlei Dam is a dam located in the Western Cape, South Africa near the town of Gouda. Water from the reservoir is supplied to water treatment works of the City of Cape Town and the West Coast District Municipality, and can also be released into the Berg River for agricultural purposes or to fill the Misverstand Dam.

The Voëlvlei Dam was constructed in 1952 to expand the capacity of the Voëlvlei lake which formed in a natural depression. Because the lake had a limited catchment area a canal was also constructed to supply water to the reservoir from a weir in the Nuwekloof Pass on the Klein Berg River. To meet increased demand for water from Cape Town the dam wall was raised in 1969, and in 1971 a second canal was constructed to supply water from the Leeu River and Vier-en-Twintig River, which drain the Groot Winterhoek.

Since 1734 the farm on which Voëlvlei Dam is situated belonged to the Walters family, who were of German descent. In 1948 the government expropriated the land and the farm for the Berg River Irrigation Scheme. The state paid compensation to the Walters family in the amount of £44,000 and the Vogelvlei Quarries (Pty) Ltd which bought the remainder of Voëlvlei in 1946 for £48,000. The Walters family did not agree to the expropriation and maintained a long-standing dispute with the then Nationalist government. After South Africa became a democratic country in 1994 the son of the former owner of Voëlvlei instituted a land claim under the Land Restitution Act.

References 

Dams in South Africa
Dams completed in 1971